Cass Township is a township in Wapello County, Iowa, USA.

History
Cass Township was organized in 1851.

References

Townships in Wapello County, Iowa
Townships in Iowa